Cristina Pacheco is a journalist, writer, interviewer and television personality who lives and works in Mexico City. While her journalism career began in 1960, continuing with regular columns in La Jornada, she is best known for her work in television, hosting two shows called Aquí nos tocó vivir and Conversando con Cristina Pacheco, both on Once TV since 1980. Which these shows, Pacheco interviews notable people and profiles popular Mexican culture, which includes interviews with common people.  She has received over forty prizes and other recognitions for her work including Mexico’s National Journalism Prize and the first Rosario Castellanos a la Trayectoria Cultural de la Mujer Award for outstanding women in the Spanish-speaking world.

Life
Cristina Pacheco was born Cristina Romo Hernández on September 13, 1941 in San Felipe Torres Mochas, Guanajuato. She was younger of one of six children of a family poor enough to know what hunger was. However, her parents taught her not to beg from others nor to cry. The family left Guanajuato to live in San Luis Potosí but only for briefly, because there Pacheco hurt herself gravely and the family moved to Mexico City for her medical treatment. Her mother decided that the family should stay in the city as she had family there. (passion) Her family all lived in one room with no privacy. Although she did not have money or toys, she did have freedom, as it was easy for her to escape as her mother was always busy. She would stay by the doors of houses and eavesdrop on neighbors. She says she saw and heard many things as no one took notice of her. For this reason she calls herself an “insignificant child, not because she thought she was insignificant but because other saw her as such. What she saw was the good and bad in life. This inspired in her the desire to be a writer and journalist, from which she never wavered.

She attended the Universidad Nacional Autónoma de México receiving a bachelor’s in Spanish. She is married to writer, poet and translator José Emilio Pacheco, from whom she took her professional name and with whom she has two daughters. She does not like to talk about the details of her relationship with her husband, stating only that it is an ordinary marriage although she admires her husband’s work greatly. Despite her successful career in radio and television, she has not encourage her daughters to follow this path because she does not believe these media inform the public as they should. She does not like being famous. She does much of her own housework because she says it “keeps her feet on the ground” and she cannot work unless there is a certain amount of order.  She has been invited to run for political office but has declined.

Career as a journalist and writer
Her career began in writing and she has been an editor, journalist and writer of various genres. She is best known for her work chronicling the popular culture of Mexico, later doing this in radio and television. She still considers herself first a journalist and writer, which to her is adventure, imagination and improvisation. When she was younger and single she wanted to cover war stories and the like, but today she is quite satisfied with the work that she does.

She began her journalism career in 1960 with the El Popular and Novedades newspapers. In 1963 she began writing for the Sucesos magazine with the pseudonym of Juan Ángel Real. In 1977 she joined the staff of the Siempre! magazine. She also published interviews and other articles for other publications such as El Sol de México (1976-1977), the Cuadrante de la Soledad section of El Día (1977-1985), and La Jornada from 1986 to the present. For the last, her best known work is a weekly column series entitled Mar de Historias.  She edited the Contenido book series, the Revista de al Universidad de México and Sábado a supplement of the Unomásuno publication.

In addition to newspaper columns and reports, she has also written short stories, chronicles, novels, essays and children’s literature. She has published fifteen novels including Para vivir aquí (1983), Sopita de fideo (1984), Cuarto de azotea (1986), Zona de desastre (1986), La última noche del tigre (1987), El corazón de la noche (1989), Para mirar a lo lejos (1989), Amores y desamores (1996), Los trabajos perdidos (1998),  El oro del desierto (2005). Books which feature collections of her interviews include Testimonio y conversaciones (1984), La luz de México (1988), Los dueños de la noche (1990), Al pie de la letra (2001), Limpios de todo amor, cuentos reunidos, 1997-2001 (2001) (a collection of her works from Mar de historias) and La rueda de la fortuna (1993). Her interview collections often have a narrative feel.  Children’s books include  La chistera maravillosa (2004), El eucalipto Ponciano  (2006), La canción del grillo 2006, Se vende burro (2006), Dos amigos (2008), El pájaro de madera (2008) and Humo en tus ojos (2010).

Career on radio and television
Despite her long journalism career, it has been her work on television which has made her famous. She began as a commentator on the show Séptimo Días on Channel 13 on which she realized a series of interviews with writer Renato Leduc. Since 1977 she has worked with Once TV starting as commentator on the shows Así fue la semana and De todos modo Juan te llamas, a series of interview with writer Juan de la Cabada. In 1980, she began hosting two shows of her own on Once, Aquí nos tocó Vivir and Conversando, con Cristina Pacheco, which remain on the air. Both cover cultural topics related to Mexico.

With the show Conversando, con Cristina Pacheco, she profiles people in the arts and popular culture such as writers, musicians, artists, artisans, sports figures, which have included Portuguese writer José Saramago, Catalan lyricist Joan Manuel Serrat, painters Juan Soriano and Perro Aguayo . With Aquí nos tocó vivir, the emphasis is on everyday Mexico, including interviews with people who are not famous but whose stories intrigue Pacheco.

She researches her subjects prior to interview but she does not prepare a list of questions because she feels this is demeaning. She does not like to be interviewed herself, but it allows her to understand those she interviews. She is not confrontational with her interviews as not only is this not well viewed in Mexico, she also believes that there are limits to what an interviewer should ask. The interviews last from between two and three hours before they are edited down. She says every person has his/her unique story even interviewing the same person twice will yield different results. For this reason, she says that she is still nervous before each interview she does, worried that she might not get all of the most important information. She says all of her interviewees have impressed her, with no one person standing out.

She also has done radio work, appearing on XEQ-AM radio with programs such as Voz pública and Los dueños de la noche, on XEW-AM with the program Aquí y ahora and Radio Fórmula with the programs Los amos de la noche and Periodismo y algo más.

Recognition
Pacheco has received over forty awards and other recognitions over her career. These include the National Journalism Prize in 1975 and 1985, the National Association of Journalist Price in 1986, the Teponaxtli Prize from Malinalco in 1986 and the Medalla al Mérito Ciudadano. In 2001, she was honored by Once TV with a commemorative plaque at the company. In 2006 she was honored with an episode of a program called “El ciclo Celebrando a …” from CONACULTA at the Centro Cultural Tijuana. In 2011 she received a national homage at the Palacio de Bellas Artes. In 2012, she received several important awards, such as the Juan Crisóstomo Doria Prize from the Universidad Autónoma del Estado de Hidalgo, recognition at the Feria Internacional del Libro in Guadalajara and the first Rosario Castellanos a la Trayectoria Cultural de la Mujer Award at the Palacio de Bellas Artes. This award was created to recognize women in the Spanish speaking world who stand out in their fields and promote culture.

References

1941 births
Living people
Mexican women writers
Mexican television personalities